Angels of the Apocalypse is the second full-length album by Timo Tolkki's Finnish metal opera project Avalon, released on May 16, 2014 in Europe and four days later in North America.

It is the second part of the trilogy created by Tolkki, written as a prequel to the previous album The Land of New Hope.

As with the previous effort, several heavy metal singers were invited to play the characters of the story of the album, with female vocalist Elize Ryd of Amaranthe reprising her role and Floor Jansen (Nightwish, ReVamp) playing the main character. The rest of the cast includes Fabio Lione (Rhapsody of Fire, Angra), David DeFeis (Virgin Steele), Simone Simons (Epica), Caterina Nix (solo Chilean singer who is having her debut album produced by Timo Tolkki) and Zachary Stevens (ex-Savatage, Circle II Circle).

Background and recording 
The album started to be composed in August 2013 in Greece, to where Timo travelled to seek inspiration.

In October 2013, Timo Tolkki launched a news website for the project in which he announced the album, which was provisionally titled Avalon II. Tolkki also announced he would be working with former Stratovarius bandmates Tuomo Lassila (drums) and Antti Ikonen (keyboards).

In late January, Tolkki revealed the name of the album and the remaining singers. Timo also announced that there will be a contest for guitar and keyboard players, with the winners getting a chance to perform a solo with him in one of the songs.

Once again, the artwork was created by French artist Stanis W. Decker.

Timo stated he created some songs with a specific singer in mind. The title-track will clock around 10:00. He also described the music of the album as "darker and heavier" than its predecessor, which was necessary due to the "Apocalyptic scenes described in the lyrics".

Track listing

Personnel
Instrumentalists
Timo Tolkki (ex-Stratovarius) — lead and rhythm guitars (Fender), bass, add. keyboards
Tuomo Lassila (ex-Stratovarius) — drums
Antti Ikonen (ex-Stratovarius) — keyboards
Vocalists
David DeFeis (Virgin Steele)
Floor Jansen (Nightwish, ReVamp)
Fabio Lione (Rhapsody of Fire, Vision Divine, Angra)
Caterina Nix (Cati Torrealba)
Elize Ryd (Amaranthe)
Simone Simons (Epica)
Zachary Stevens (ex-Savatage, Circle II Circle)
Additional cast
Nicolas Jeudy - orchestrations

References

External links
Avalon official website
Frontiers Records website

2014 albums
Rock operas
Concept albums
Frontiers Records albums
Timo Tolkki albums